Just for Tonight may refer to:

 Just for Tonight (film), a 1918 silent film starring Tom Moore
 "Just for Tonight" (One Night Only song)
 "Just for Tonight" (Vanessa Williams song)
 "Just for Tonight", a song by The Chiffons
 "Just for Tonight", a song by Gilbert Montagné
 "Just for Tonight", a song by Seiko Matsuda
 "Just for Tonight", a song by Ville Valo and Manna Lindström